Darjeeling is a hill station municipality in West Bengal, India.

Darjeeling may also refer to:
 Darjeeling tea, a beverage made in Darjeeling

Administrative areas of India 
 Darjeeling district, a subdivision of West Bengal
 Darjeeling (Lok Sabha constituency), a constituency of India's lower house
 Darjeeling (Vidhan Sabha constituency), a state assembly constituency
 Darjeeling Pulbazar (community development block)

Arts and entertainment 
 A character from the Girls und Panzer Japanese anime series
 "Darjeeling", a song on Caprisongs by FKA Twigs